Tintaldra  is a town in northeast Victoria, Australia in the Shire of Towong local government area and on the upper reaches of the Murray River,  northeast of the state capital, Melbourne and  east of the regional centre of Wodonga.

History
The first people of the area were the Ngarigo and the Walgalu.

European settlement began in the Tintaldra in 1837 with the arrival of squatters looking for fresh grass and water for cattle.  The town began to form around 1854 as unlucky prospectors began to look for land to farm, though of insufficient size to justify a Post Office until 1 January 1867.

Its location as a crossing point over the Murray River and its associated customs house led to a boom period in the late 19th century.  Federation and the development of other river crossings into New South Wales led to a slow decline. Soldier settlers moved to the area after World War I.  Much of Tintaldra was burnt to the ground in the Black Friday bushfires of 13 January 1939.

Today
Tintaldra's economy is based around agriculture and tourism. The Tintaldra store, constructed in 1864 with rough hewn River Red Gum beams and rafters and walls made from vertical slats of Stringybark timber, is still standing today.  Nearby Burrowa-Pine Mountain National Park is a popular place for bushwalking and camping.

Upper Murray Football League
The town had an Australian rules football team involved with the Upper Murray Football League. Tintaldra first played from 1912 to 1913. After this first unsuccessful run they rejoined in 1951. The club expanded in 1963 to include Khancoban, NSW and was renamed Tintaldra-Khancoban United FC. The club officially went into recess at the end of the 1967 season.

Gallery

See also
 Murray River crossings
 Murray River Flag

References

External links

SMH Travel site - Tintaldra page
Roads and Traffic Authority - Tintaldra Bridge

Populated places on the Murray River
Towns in Victoria (Australia)
Shire of Towong